Dennstaedtiaceae is one of fifteen families in the order Polypodiales, the most derived families within monilophytes (ferns). It comprises 10 genera with ca 240 known species, including one of the world's most abundant ferns, Pteridium aquilinum (bracken). Members of the order generally have large, highly divided leaves and have either small, round intramarginal sori with cup-shaped indusia (e.g. Dennstaedtia) or linear marginal sori with a false indusium formed from the reflexed leaf margin (e.g. Pteridium).  The morphological diversity among members of the order has confused past taxonomy, but recent molecular studies have supported the monophyly of the order and the family. The reclassification of Dennstaedtiaceae and the rest of the monilophytes was published in 2006, so most of the available literature is not updated.

Characteristics
 Terrestrial or scrambling (scandent) over rocks or stones (epilithic) or occasionally over other vegetation (epiphytic)
 Rhizomes long-creeping, occasionally short-creeping
 Rhizomes bearing jointed hairs, or peltate, non-clathrate, entire scales, or both, with transitions
 Rhizomes often solenostelic or protostelic with internal phloem, or rarely short and dyctiostelic
 Petioles close or more often remote, non-articulate, usually with one or two, less often several vascular bundles
 Petioles often with epipetiolar buds
 Petioles usually with gutter-shaped vascular strand (open end adaxial)
 Petiole either pubescent or glabrous
 Mature leaves often glabrous at maturity, or bearing (mostly articulate) hairs, not scaly; hairs often persistent on leaf axes
 Blades often large
 Blades often 2-3 pinnate to decompound, can be 1-4 pinnate or more divided, mostly distinctly anadromous
 Veins free, or forked, or pinnate, ending with more or less thickened ends behind the margin, rarely vanishing, free included veinlets none
 Stomata anomocytic and/or polocytic
 Sori near the margin, or submarginal, sometimes fused with the blade to form a cup or pouch or obscured in a recurved portion of the blade margin joining 2 to very many vein ends
 Sori mostly linear, may be discrete
 Indusia linear or cup shaped at blade margin, or reflexed over sori
 Indusia sometimes wanting and replaced by the reflexed, more or less modified leaf margin; sometimes such a "false" indusium present beside a "true" one
 Sporangium stalk with 1-3 rows of cells
 Sterile appendages among sporangia none or if present not or little differentiated from epidermal appendages
 Capsule usually with well-differentiated stomium
 Spore tetrahedral and trilete, or reniform and monolete, variously sculptured
 Gametophyte known in comparatively few representatives
 Gametophyte green, hairless, cordate, and the plate stage is reached soon after germination
Characteristics described by Smith et al., Judd et al., and Kramer, K. U.

Distribution of genera
Generally, the family is pantropical, but due to the distribution of Pteridium (the most widespread fern genus), Dennstaedtiaceae can be found worldwide. Pteridium is a well adapted early successional genus, generally described as a weed because of its ease of spread. The spore is light and robust, so it can travel relatively far and colonise open, disturbed environments easily. Dennsteadtia is mostly tropical to warm-temperate, but not well represented in the Amazon or Africa. Oenotrichia is in New Caledonia. Leptolepia is in New Zealand, Queensland (Australia), and in New Guinea. Microlepia is in the Asiatic-Pacific. Paesia occurs in tropical America, Asia, and the western Pacific. Hypolepis is tropical and south-temperate.  Blotiella is strongly centered in Africa. Histiopteris is generally Malesian, with one pantropic to south-temperate species. The extinct genus Krameropteris is known from remains found in Cenomanian aged Burmese amber.

History of classification
Dennstaedtiaceae was previously considered the only family the order Dennstaedtiales. Dennstaedtiaceae now contains the previously defined families Monachosoraceae Ching, Pteridiaceae Ching, and Hypolepidaceae Pic. Serm. Before Smith's  classification in 2006, Dennstaedtiaceae was a poly- and para- phyletic family, containing genera that now are classified within Lindsaeaceae and Saccolomataceae, and with the family Monachosoraceae arising from within the Dennstaedtiaceae clade. The nonmonophyletic nature of Dennstaedtiaceae (pre-2006 classification) was proved and supported by multiple molecular studies. Dennstaedtiaceae as now classified is supported as monophyletic, but the relation of the genera within the family have not yet been fully clarified.

Phylogeny of Lindsaeaceae

Interesting species within Dennstaedtiaceae
Dennsteadtiaceae species and genera are usually known for their weedy nature (i.e. Pteridium spp., Hypolepis spp., Paesia spp.), but some species are grown ornamentally (Blotiella spp., Dennstaedtia spp., Hypolepis spp., Microlepia spp.). 
The fiddleheads/crosiers of Pteridium aquilinum have been known to be eaten, but they contain carcinogens, so this practice is not prevalent.
The rhizomes of Pteridium esculentum were consumed by the Maori during their settlement of New Zealand in the 13th century, but no longer are a part of the Maori diet. The rhizomes of Pteridium esculentum contain about 50% starch when they grow in loose rich soil, at relatively deep depths. The rhizomes were a staple in the diet because once dried, the rhizomes were very light (perfect for travelling) and would keep for about a year as long as they remained dry. The leaves and spores of the Pteridium esculentum are associated with toxins and carcinogens, and have been known to cause stock (cattle, sheep, horses, pigs) to sicken.

References

 
Polypodiales
Fern families
Taxa named by Johannes Paulus Lotsy